Sinogentiana is a genus of flowering plants belonging to the family Gentianaceae.

Its native range is China.

Species:

Sinogentiana souliei 
Sinogentiana striata

References

Gentianaceae
Gentianaceae genera